The Nizhny Novgorod Research Institute of Radio Engineering (NNIIRT) is a Russian electronics company specializing in the development and manufacturing of radar equipment. It is a subsidiary of the Almaz-Antey group.

History
Founded in 1947, NNIIRT is based in the city of Nizhny Novgorod.

Beginning in 1975, NNIIRT developed the first VHF 3D radar capable of measuring height, range, and azimuth to a target. This effort produced the 55Zh6 'Nebo' VHF surveillance radar, which passed acceptance trials in 1982.

In the post–Cold War era, NNIIRT developed the 55Zh6 Nebo U 'Tall Rack' radar, which has been integrated with the SA-21 anti-aircraft weapons system. This system is deployed around Moscow.

In 2013, NNIIRT announced the further development of the 55Zh6UME Nebo-UME, which combines VHF and L band radars on a single assembly.

NNIIRT designed air surveillance radars
The Nizhny Novgorod Research Institute of Radio Engineering (Russian acronym: NNIIRT) has since 1948 developed a number of radars. These were mainly radars in the VHF-band, and many of which featured developments in technology that represented "first offs" in the Soviet Union.

Innovations include the first Soviet air surveillance radar with a circular scan; the P-8 Volga (NATO: KNIFE REST A) in 1950, the first 3D-radar; the 5N69 Salute (NATO: BIG BACK) in 1975, and in 1982 the first VHF-band 3D-radar; the 55Zh6 Nebo (NATO: TALL RACK).

Other innovations were radars with frequency hopping; the P-10 Volga A (NATO: KNIFE REST B) in 1953, radars with transmitter signal coherency and special features like moving target indicator (MTI); the P-12 Yenisei (NATO: SPOON REST) in 1955, as well as the P-70 Lena-M with chirp signal modulation in 1968.

References

External links
www.nniirt.ru - Website (Russian language)

Manufacturing companies based in Nizhniy Novgorod
Electronics companies of Russia
1947 establishments in the Soviet Union
Research institutes in Russia
Almaz-Antey
Defence companies of Russia
Electronics companies of the Soviet Union
Research institutes in the Soviet Union
Defence companies of the Soviet Union